Avibacterium is a genus of Gram-negative bacteria from the family Pasteurellaceae.

References

Further reading

Pasteurellales
Bacteria genera